The Saint Petersburg Police, officially the Main Administration for Internal Affairs of the City of St. Petersburg and the Leningrad Oblast (Главное управление внутренних дел Санкт-Петербурга и Ленинградской области) is the state police force of Saint Petersburg and Leningrad Oblast, Russia. The main responsibilities of the service are the internal security, protection of human rights and freedoms, suppression and detection of crime, and protection of public order.

It is one of the oldest police services in Russia and the world, established on June 7, 1718, by Peter the Great as the municipal police for city of Saint Petersburg. During the Soviet era, from 1924 the service was known as the Leningrad Militsiya until 1991, when it was changed to Saint Petersburg Militsiya. The service adopted its current name in 2011 following reform in law enforcement agencies across Russia replacing the term "militsiya" with "police".

The Saint Petersburg Police belongs to the Ministry of Internal Affairs, an agency of the Government of Russia, but is primarily subordinate to the state governments of Saint Petersburg and Leningrad Oblast, respectively. The service is headed by a Commissioner appointed by the Governor of Saint Petersburg, and is then confirmed by the Saint Petersburg Legislative Assembly on the recommendation of the President of Russia. The current Commissioner of Saint Petersburg Police since February 11, 2012, is Lieutenant-General Sergey Umnov.

History

Tsarist era
The Saint Petersburg Police was established by Tsar Peter the Great on June 7, 1718, as the main municipal police force in Saint Petersburg, the capital of the Russian Empire which had been founded by Peter only fifteen years earlier. Anton de Vieira, a batman of Peter and mayor of Saint Petersburg at the time, was appointed as the first "Oberpolitzmeister" (a German, not Russian word:  Senior Police Master), the title for the commander of the city police service. The department survived intact until 1917 during the February Revolution, when most of the Saint Petersburg Police remained loyal to the Imperial government. A number of policemen were killed after the defection of the bulk of the city's army garrison to the revolution, especially when a rumour spread that the police were firing with machine guns from the roofs of buildings.

Soviet and post-Soviet periods
Shortly after the overthrow of the Imperial government the department was formally disbanded. Following the October Revolution, a new Soviet police force was established under the title of militsiya, which replaced the functions of the Saint Petersburg Police. In 1924, following the renaming of Saint Petersburg to Leningrad in honor of Vladimir Lenin, the city police were known as the Leningrad Militsiya (. This name continued until 1991, shortly after the dissolution of the Soviet Union, when it was changed to Saint Petersburg Militsiya (милицию Санкт-Петербурга) after the name of the city was reverted. The service adopted its current name on March 1, 2011, as part of wider law enforcement legislative reform backed by Russian President Dmitry Medvedev, which abandoned usage of the term "militsiya" in favor of the re-adoption of "politsiya" (police) in law enforcement agencies across Russia.

Organization and structure

Organization 

 Tourism Police (The St. Petersburg Tourist Police; туристическая полиция) was established in 2011 as a single law enforcement agency for crimes committed against tourists and is responsible for providing assistance to visitors to the city. The Tourist Police was given responsibility for undertaking these roles by the regional branch of the Russian Tourism Ministry.
 The River Police of St. Petersburg – The River Police of St. Petersburg (Речная полиция Санкт-Петербурга) was a unique law enforcement body that was responsible for supervision over the waters of the rivers in Saint Petersburg and the body was subordinate to the city police commissioner. The River Police force was established in 1866.
 Central Investigation Department (The Detective Police of St. Petersburg; Сыскная полиция Санкт-Петербурга) was established in 1714 and was the first of its kind in Russia. In 1880, the detective police was replaced with the Capital Department of the Okhrana. Since 1918, the function of investigating crime in the city has been performed by the Main Criminal Investigations Directorate.
 Aviation Directorate
 Crime Scene Unit
 High-Crimes office
 Management of private security
 Department of Economic Security and Anti-Corruption
 Mounted Police
 OMON – Special Response Unit
 Directorate of accidents registration
 Office of the State Inspection of Road Safety (Traffic Police)
 Administration for the protection of public order and interaction with the executive authorities
 Press service and information center
 Cultural center
 Pension Service Center
 Professional training center
 Federal Migratory Police (Official Website)
 Main Directorate for Drugs Control

District Police Departments

Saint Petersburg Police Commissioner 
The Commissioner of the Saint Petersburg Police, officially Head of Internal Affairs of Saint Petersburg, is a commissioner with authority as the head of the service, responsible for the day-to-day operation of the department as well as the appointment of deputies and subordinate officers. The Commissioner is a policeman administrator appointed by the appointed by the Governor of Saint Petersburg, confirmed after the approval of the Saint Petersburg Legislative Assembly by recommendation of the President of Russia, and serves indefinitely at the Governor's will. The position is sometimes mistaken as the Chief of Police, which is separate from the Saint Petersburg Police and the holder of which serves as the Deputy to the Head of Internal Affairs.

The current Commissioner is Lieutenant-General Roman Plugin, who was appointed by Governor Aleksander Beglov and took office on 2019. The longest serving Commissioner is Aleksander Sokolov, who served as Commissioner of the Leningrad Militsiya for 10 years (1962–1972), under Mayors Vasily Isayev and Aleksandr Sizov.

List of heads of Main Interior affairs Dept. of Saint Petersburg and Leningrad Oblast 
Arkady Kramarev (1990–1994)
Yuri Loskutov (1994–1996)
Anatoly Ponidelko (1996–1998)
Victor Vlasov (June 1998 – November 1999)
Benjamin Petukhov (1999–2002)
Mikhail Vanichkin (2002–2006)
 Vladislav Piotrovsky (2006–2011)
 Mikhail Sukhodolsky (2011–2012)
 Sergey Umnov (2012–2019)
 Roman Plugin (Since February 28, 2019)

Former positions

Oberpolitzmeister of Saint Petersburg 
The position of Commissioner can be traced back to the position of Oberpolitzmeister, meaning "Chief master of the police" in German, created by Tsar Peter the Great when he founded the Saint Petersburg Police in 1718 to take charge of the day-to-day operation of the service.

List of Oberpolitzmeisters of Saint Petersburg 
Anton de Vieira (1718–1745), while serving as Mayor of Saint Petersburg
Christoph von Münnich (1731–1732)
Vasily Saltykov (1732–1740)
Fyodor Naumov (1740–1744)
Alexei Tatischev (1745–1760)
Nikolai Corff (1760–1766)
Nikolai Chicherin (1764–1778)
Dmitry Volkov (1778–1782)
Nikita Riliev (1784–1794)
Fyodor Trepov (1866–1873)
Alexander Kozlov (1881–1882)
Peter Gresser (1882–1883)

List of commissioners of the Leningrad Militsiya 
 Clement Voroshilov (1917–1918)
 Aleksandr Sokolov (1962–1972)

Popular culture

Television series
 Petersburg Gangsters (Бандитский Петербург) features the conflict between Saint Petersburg Police and local criminals.
 Liteiniy, 4 (Литейный, 4) is centered on a special unit in the Saint Petersburg Police located on Liteyny Avenue. The title of the show is a reference to the address of Bolshoy Dom, the Saint Petersburg headquarters of the Ministry of Internal Affairs.
 Deadly Force (Убойная сила) starring Konstantin Khabensky, one of the most popular TV series about Saint Petersburg Police, was aired on Channel One since 2000 til 2005, for 6 seasons and 57 episodes. Alongside this series, was another TV Show about local police called Streets of Broken Lights (Улицы разбитых фонарей) which was aired for 15 seasons and 433 episodes, from 1998 til 2014.
 Opera. Homicide's Chronicles (Опера. Хроники убойного отдела) which aired first on Russia-1 in November 2004.

See also

 Politsiya - the federal police service of Russia.
 Militsiya
Moscow Police
 List of law enforcement agencies

References

External links 
 Official Website
 Department for Road Safety of Saint Petersburg and Leningrad Oblast (Saint Petersburg Traffic Police)
Police Commissioner page on the Saint Petersburg Police website
 http://police-vyborg.ru/ Vyborg Police

 
Organizations based in Saint Petersburg
1718 establishments in Russia
Law enforcement agencies of Russia